Cristo Rey Tampa Salesian High School is a Catholic college-preparatory school and work study program sponsored by the Salesians of Don Bosco. Opened in 2016, it is a part of the national Cristo Rey Network of schools. The school's goal is to give children from lower income families a better chance of getting a college education. To be admitted, students must meet financial need guidelines.

Academics
The Cristo Rey curriculum is designed and taught to prepare students for success in college and life. Cristo Rey Tampa Salesian High School offers a rigorous college preparatory curriculum (standard and honors) using an instructional model that maximizes the use of technology and meaningful assessment. The Cristo Rey curriculum offers both dual enrollment and Advanced Placement (AP) courses.

Corporate work study program
The signature and differentiating component of Cristo Rey Tampa Salesian High School is the Corporate Work Study Program (CWSP). Through this innovative program, students receive a private, college preparatory education, while gaining invaluable real-world work experience from leading corporations and non-profit organizations in the Tampa Bay area. The Cristo Rey Corporate Work Study Program has been praised for allowing students to gain real-world work experience across many different professional fields, and has been shown to have a significant formative impact on students – demystifying the world outside their neighborhoods; developing workplace readiness skills; introducing them to role models and supportive mentors; and building competence, confidence and aspiration for college and career success.

Extracurriculars
While academics and honoring student corporate work skills are the main focus, Cristo Rey Tampa Salesian High School also offers students the opportunity to participate in clubs, club sports and competitive sports. Students may participate in clubs such as Campus Youth Ministry, Hispanic Honor Society, Key Club, Multicultural Club, National Honor Society and Student Government. Club sports include Baseball and Tennis. As a member of the Florida Independent High School Athletic Association (FIHSAA), competitive sports include Boys Baseball, Boys and Girls Basketball, Boys and Girls Bass Fishing, Boys and Girls Soccer and Girls Volleyball.

Financial aid
Cristo Rey Tampa Salesian High School provides an affordable means of education for deserving young people and their families. Every student receives financial assistance from Florida Tax Credit Scholarships, administered by Step Up For Students, Cristo Rey Tampa scholarships and the Cristo Rey Work Study Program.

References

External links
 Cristo Rey Network
 Cristo Rey Tampa Salesian High School

Salesian secondary schools
Cristo Rey Network
Catholic secondary schools in Florida
Educational institutions established in 2016
Poverty-related organizations
2016 establishments in Florida